The Tony Honors for Excellence in Theatre is a non-competitive award created by the American Theatre Wing in 1990. They are presented to institutions, individuals and/or organizations that have demonstrated extraordinary achievement in theatre, but are not eligible to compete in any of the established Tony Award categories. The Tony Honors "are announced in the autumn. They are bestowed at a separate ceremony that affords recipients a special moment in the spotlight." As explained in Playbill, "In 2003, a new tradition began for the Tony Honors, which were previously announced during the Tony Awards broadcast. Last year, however, the Honors were presented in the fall..."

The first recipient was Alfred Drake, who was recognized for his lengthy career in musical theatre.

Recipients
1990: Alfred Drake
1991: Father George Moore, pastor of St. Malachy's Church (known as The Actors’ Chapel) "for his service and commitment to the needy and elderly of the theater district and improving conditions in the Times Square area."
1992: Tom Jones and Harvey Schmidt for The Fantasticks, now in its 33rd year Off-Broadway.
1993: International Alliance of Theatrical Stage Employees, "a labor union of professional craftspeople in 900 locals who work behind the scenes in the entertainment industry"; Broadway Cares/Equity Fights AIDS. The entertainment industry's most active charity addressing the challenges of AIDS.
1995: National Endowment for the Arts
1998: The International Theatre Institute of the United States
2000: Eileen Heckart; General Manager/Producer Sylvia Herscher; City Center Encores!
2001: Betty Corwin, founder and director of the Theatre on Film and Tape Archive of the New York Public Library for the Performing Arts; New Dramatists; Theatre World
2003: The principal ensemble of Baz Luhrmann's La Bohème; wig and hair stylist Paul Huntley; Johnson-Liff Casting Associates; The Acting Company.
2004: The cast of the 2003 Broadway production of Big River; Nancy Coyne, chief executive of the theater advertising agency Serino Coyne; restaurateurs Frances and Harry Edelstein of Cafe Edison and Vincent Sardi, Jr. of Sardi's; photographer Martha Swope.
2005: Producer Peter Neufeld; Theatre Communications Group.
2006: BMI Lehman Engel Musical Theater Workshop; Forbidden Broadway and its creator, Gerard Alessandrini; William Morris Agency Senior VP Samuel Liff; Ellen Stewart.
2007: Gemze de Lappe; wardrobe supervisor Alyce Gilbert; CEO of Hudson Scenic Studios Neil Mazzella; musician and musical contractor Seymour "Red" Press.
2009: Press agent Shirley Herz.
2010: The Alliance of Resident Theatres New York; B.H. Barry (teacher); Tom Viola (BC/EFA executive director).
2011: William Berloni (animal trainer); The Drama Book Shop (West 40th Street, Manhattan); Sharon Jensen and Alliance for Inclusion in the Arts.
2012: entertainment attorney Freddie Gershon; Artie Siccardi; the TDF Open Doors Program
2013: NYC Mayor Michael Bloomberg, Career Transition For Dancers; William "Bill" Craver; Peter Lawrence (Production Stage Manager); The Lost Colony (Roanoke Island, in Manteo, North Carolina); jointly to Sophia Gennusa, Oona Laurence, Bailey Ryon and Milly Shapiro, the four actresses who share the lead in Matilda the Musical.
2014: Actors Fund of America President Joseph P. Benincasa; photographer Joan Marcus; general manager Charlotte Wilcox.
2015: Scenery designer Arnold Abramson; public relations consultant Adrian Bryan-Brown; theatre technician Gene O'Donovan.
2016: Entertainment attorney Seth Gelblum; vocal coach Joan Lader; costume shop proprietor Sally Ann Parsons.
2017: General managers Nina Lannan and Alan Wasser.
2018: New York Times photographer Sara Krulwich, costume beader Bessie Nelson, and Ernest Winzer Cleaners.
2019: Broadway Inspirational Voices, founded by Tony and Grammy Awards nominee Michael McElroy, Chair Emeritus, Tony Award winner and Emmy nominee Phylicia Rashad
2020: President of PRG Scenic Technologies Fred Gallo, press agent Irene Gandy, stage manager Beverly Jenkins, and the New Federal Theatre
2022: Asian American Performers Action Coalition, Broadway for All, music copyist Emily Grishman, Feinstein's/54 Below, and United Scenic Artists (Local USA 829, IATSE).

References

External links
Official Tony Awards website

American theater awards
Tony Awards
Culture of New York City
Awards established in 1990
1990 establishments in New York City